Kim Jung-min or Kim Jŏng-min is a Korean name consisting of the family name Kim and the given name Jung-min, and may also refer to:

 Kim Jung-min (entertainer) (born 1968), South Korean actor and singer
 Kim Jung-min (born 1985), stage name Shin So-yul, South Korean actress
  (born 1989), South Korean actress
 Kim Jung-min (basketball) (born 1972), South Korean basketball player
 Kim Jeong-min (curler) (born 1992), South Korean curler
 Kim Jung-min (footballer) (born 1999), South Korean football midfielder
 Kim Jong-min (North Korean footballer)